CPI International, Inc. is the holding company for Communications & Power Industries, the largest manufacturer and rebuilder of electron devices (primarily vacuum tubes) in the United States.  CPI was founded in 1995 when Varian Associates sold its electron-device business (the original business of its founders) to concentrate on medical systems.  Its major subsidiaries include Eimac (which manufactures new vacuum tubes for the broadcasting, radar, medical systems, and other applications), Econco (a vacuum-tube rebuilder), Beverly Microwave Systems, and Radant Technologies.  CPI International made its initial public offering in April, 2006.

CPI's Econco division remanufactures Eimac and Machlett power tubes.

In February 2011, an affiliate of Veritas Capital, a private equity investment firm which invests in companies that provide critical products and services to governments worldwide, acquired CPI for approximately $525 million. CPI International ceased trading on The Nasdaq Stock Market.

In July 2017, Odyssey Investment Partners, LLC, a private equity investment firm, acquired CPI.
 
In fiscal 2018, CPI employed approximately 2,000 people and generated approximately $492 million in sales.<

References

External links
 Corporate Web site

Companies based in Palo Alto, California
Holding companies established in 1995